Related to the urinary bladder, anteriorly there are the following folds:
 one median umbilical fold on the median umbilical ligament   (which in turn, contains the urachus)
 two medial umbilical folds on the occluded umbilical artery
 two lateral umbilical folds on the inferior epigastric vessels

References

External links
  - "Inguinal Region, Scrotum and Testes: Umbilical Folds and Peritoneal Fossae"
 
 http://www.portfolio.mvm.ed.ac.uk/studentwebs/session5/37/ALBL_Anterolateralwall.htm

Pelvis
Urinary system